The Alberta Biennial of Contemporary Art is a contemporary art exhibition which has been held at various locations in Alberta, Canada, every two years from 1996 to 2012, then on a two or three year basis since then. Its purpose is "to foster a dialogue between artists and communities across the province."

Two artists withdrew from the planned show in 2020 due to the complete exclusion of Black artists throughout the biennial's history.

History 
1996
1998
2000
2002
2004
2006
2008
2010
2012
2015: Future Station
2017: For the time being

References

Art biennials
Recurring events established in 1996
Art festivals in Canada
Canadian contemporary art